Licinius Crassus may refer to:
 Lucius Licinius Crassus, Roman orator
 Marcus Licinius Crassus (disambiguation), Romans
 including, Marcus Licinius Crassus
 Publius Licinius Crassus (disambiguation), Romans

See also 

 
 Licinii Crassi